The Gropșoarele is a left tributary of the river Teleajen in Romania. It flows into the Teleajen in Cheia.

References

Rivers of Romania
Rivers of Prahova County